Stuart Ferguslie Duncan (15 July 1906 – 2 July 1971) was a New Zealand sportsman. He played association football for the New Zealand national football team. He also played in five first-class cricket matches for Otago between 1925 and 1941.

Duncan was born at Dunedin in 1906. He was educated at Otago Boys' High School and played football for the Otago side. He worked as a manager and was a cricket selector for Otago. He died in 1971 at Dunedin; an obituary was published in the New Zealand Cricket Annual the same year.

References

External links
 

1906 births
1971 deaths
New Zealand cricketers
Otago cricketers
Cricketers from Dunedin